The 1968 football season was São Paulo's 39th season since club's existence.

Overall

{|class="wikitable"
|-
|Games played || 51 (26 Campeonato Paulista, 16 Torneio Roberto Gomes Pedrosa, 9 Friendly match)
|-
|Games won || 20 (11 Campeonato Paulista, 4 Torneio Roberto Gomes Pedrosa, 5 Friendly match)
|-
|Games drawn || 15 (6 Campeonato Paulista, 6 Torneio Roberto Gomes Pedrosa, 3 Friendly match)
|-
|Games lost || 16 (9 Campeonato Paulista, 6 Torneio Roberto Gomes Pedrosa, 1 Friendly match)
|-
|Goals scored || 81
|-
|Goals conceded || 74
|-
|Goal difference || +7
|-
|Best result || 4–0 (H) v Comercial - Campeonato Paulista - 1968.03.20
|-
|Worst result || 2–5 (H) v Santos - Campeonato Paulista - 1968.03.272–5 (A) v Fluminense - Torneio Roberto Gomes Pedrosa - 1968.10.17
|-
|Most appearances || 
|-
|Top scorer || 
|-

Friendlies

Official competitions

Campeonato Paulista

Record

Torneio Roberto Gomes Pedrosa

Record

External links
official website 

Association football clubs 1968 season
1968
1968 in Brazilian football